2019 CAF Confederation Cup may refer to:

 2018–19 CAF Confederation Cup
 2019–20 CAF Confederation Cup